Shenzhen University (SZU, Chinese: 深圳大学) is a municipal public research university in Shenzhen, Guangdong, China. The university is funded by the Shenzhen Municipal People's Government. 

SZU ranked 10th in the world for Nature Index 2021 Young Universities (Leading 150 Young Universities) and 38th in China for Nature Index 2022.

Location 
SZU comprises two campuses,  Houhai campus and Xili campus, occupying 2.72 square kilometers in total. The Houhai campus is located on the coastline of Houhai Bay with 1.34 square kilometers. The new Xili campus now under construction is located in the city's University Town and takes up 1.38 square kilometers.

History

Shenzhen University was established as a full-time comprehensive university, in line with the aim of China's Ministry of Education (MOE) to further develop the critical infrastructure in the Special Economic Zone of Shenzhen with strong supports from Chinese leading universities including Peking University, Tsinghua University and Renmin University of China. 

Professor Zhang Wei, who was the former vice-president of Tsinghua University, an Academician of the Chinese Academy of Sciences and the Chinese Academy of Engineering, was appointed its first president of to develop it.

Shenzhen University has had a favored status in China's political and academic circles. Deng Xiaoping gave his personal approval to the university and Jiang Zemin penned the university's characters in his own hand. The university has been visited by several heads of state, scientists and researchers such as Nobel Prize winner in Physics Dr. Yang Zhenning. Many business and academics have made donations to support the development of Shenzhen University and some entrepreneurs have set up funds and scholarships in various disciplines.In 1995, Shenzhen University passed the teaching evaluation for the undergraduate program accredited by MOE, and was among the first group of universities in China to have its undergraduate programs certified. In 1996, Shenzhen University was accredited by the Academic Degree Evaluation Committee of the State Council for Master's programs. In 1997, Shenzhen University reorganized into the faculty and college structure, adopted a work-study program and committed to an integrated approach to teaching.

Since 2017, the university has concentrated research-oriented teaching and has invested heavily in providing state of the art research laboratories. In 2017, the research budget totaled 9,705,000 million RMB. In 2006, three faculties were accredited to offer Ph.D degrees.

Administration

Faculty departmental structure
SZU now has 27 schools (colleges), providing 96 undergraduate majors, 38 first-grade master degree conferring disciplines; 18 professional master degree conferring disciplines and 10 first-grade doctoral degree.

Staff
The faculty consists of 3455 staff. There are 2267 teachers, 561 technicists, 627 administrative staffs, 782 postdoctoral, 220 full-time researchers, 119 visiting professors, 228 foreign teachers. It has seven academicians in the Chinese Academy of Engineering, and 10 academicians in both the Chinese Academy of Sciences and the Chinese Academy of Engineering.

Research

The university is a main research center of Shenzhen city. It produced 846 SCI cited papers in 2014. The university teaching and research faculty had 356 works authored, 35 of which were translated into various languages. In addition, two technical inventions won the second prize in the National Technical Invention Competition, and one was awarded the first prize in the provincial invention competition. There were 26 research papers and projects which won prizes for science and innovation awarded by the People's Liberation Army as well as various research achievement prizes above the provincial level. 48 inventions and innovations from Shenzhen University have been marketed and 281 inventions have been adopted.

Library
Shenzhen University library holds a collection of 51202 million items (including Phase I project of Xili campus library), consisting of 4,007,900 million paper resources and there are 257 kinds of databases, which including 2,325,500 full-text e-books in Chinese and foreign languages and 124,800 e-journal are accessible via personal computers and Internet library terminals. The campus has 30,000 Internet connections and 99 percent of its classrooms and lecture halls have been digitized.

Students
Currently, SZU has 34,949 full-time students including 27,564 undergraduates, 7132 postgraduates, 253 doctors, 837 international students, 1340 part-time postgraduates and 18784 adult education students.

It has granted diplomas to 2,000 graduates from the Hong Kong and Macao Special Administration Regions as well as Taiwan. Shenzhen University has also established "dual-campus" joint-programs for undergraduate degrees with institutions in Great Britain and other foreign countries. There are up to 2,500 students that graduated from these joint programs since the university's inception, and the quality of programs has been accredited by the British Council. Shenzhen University participates with annual exchanges students and teachers with its sister universities in the United States of America, Great Britain, Japan, and South Korea.

Rankings and reputation 
Since 2020, Shenzhen University has been listed as one of the top 300 universities in the World University Rankings.

Nature Index 
Nature Index tracks the affiliations of high-quality scientific articles and presents research outputs by institution and country on monthly basis.

Affiliated schools
 (深圳大学师范学院附属中学)

See also 
 List of universities in China
 Higher education in China
 Education in China

References

External links 

 
  
University in Turmoil: The Political Economy of Shenzhen University by Michael Agelasto (1998) 
Educational Disengagement: Undermining Academic Quality at a Chinese University by Michael Agelasto (1998) 
 "English Evangelism: A Tool for the New Century Mission". A former SZU teacher discusses her missionary work.

 
Universities and colleges in Shenzhen
Nanshan District, Shenzhen
Educational institutions established in 1983
1983 establishments in China